United Group is an alternative telecom provider in Southeast Europe that operates both telecommunications platforms and mass media outlets.

History
United Group was formed in 2007, as a Luxembourg-registered multinational entity, in a merger of Serbia Broadband (SBB) and two companies named Telemach, one in Slovenia and the other in Bosnia and Herzegovina. Telemach Montenegro became a part of United Group in 2014. Telemach acquired Tušmobil on 1 April 2015. This being a cable acquisition of a mobile network makes it a unique case in the region, and the first step of United Group into providing all telecommunication services (landline, mobile, television, and internet) in one household.

Today, United Group is the largest alternative pay television platform in the region of the former Yugoslavia, providing television, Internet, landline and mobile telephony to a large number of households and offices in the region through its cable, DTH and OTT platforms.

In 2013, the group started its worldwide OTT platform, NetTV Plus, through which it provides Pay TV and landline telephony services to the former Yugoslav diaspora. As the group’s distribution platforms developed extensively throughout the region, the next step was entering the content and advertising sales business, today represented by United Media.

In March 2014, United Group was bought by Kohlberg Kravis Roberts, a leading global investment firm with headquarters in New York, and U.S. 94.3 billion in assets under management. The European Bank for Reconstruction and Development (EBRD) is a co-investor in the company.

In September 2018, a British private equity firm BC Partners began the process of acquisition of the majority stakes of United Group from KKR for an enterprise valuation of 2.6 billion euros. The acquisition was finalized on 4 March 2019.

On 24 December 2020, United Group announced they would buy Bulgaria's Nova Broadcasting Group; the acquisition was completed on 22 January 2021.

Technological development
The company was the first to offer digital landline telephony services in 2012. This was also the year United Group launched the first application for watching television and using TV services on different mobile devices.

In 2016, United Group established United Cloud, the in-house technology and software "innovation center".

In September 2017, EON TV platform was launched, which allows viewers in Serbia to watch TV via a smart TV app. In 2018, United Group launched EON Smart Box, which was the first regional solution to combine television with Android services and applications.

In 2018, United Group also partnered with Fon Wireless to expand its Wi-Fi network and enable regional customers the access to more than 68 million Wi-Fi hotspots all over the world.

Telecommunication platforms
Today, United Group is the largest alternative pay television platform in the former Yugoslavia region, providing television, Internet, landline, and mobile telephony to a large number of households and offices in the region through its cable, DTH and OTT platforms.

The Group provides services across four key brands:

Serbia Broadband – the alternative cable operator in Serbia.
Telemach – the alternative cable and mobile telecommunications operator in Bosnia and Herzegovina, Croatia, and Montenegro, and Slovenia.
TotalTV – the regional satellite television platform.
NetTV Plus – the OTT provider serving the diaspora from Southeast Europe
Nova – the Greek landline phone, internet, and TV service. It also owns several channels, namely Nova Cinema, Novasports, and Nova Life. These channels are offered only to satellite TV subscribers. The company comes from the merger of Nova with Wind Hellas which was acquired by United Group on August 16, 2021.

United Media
United Media is a combination of top Pay TV channels in the region (sports, movies, kids) and CAS Media providing clients with targeted media buying on most of the regional cable channels. United Media channel offer is available for cable, DTH, OTT, and IPTV distribution. In 2018, United Media announced the acquisition of Direct Media, a regional advertising agency.

United Media channels:

Sport Klub 1
Sport Klub 2
Sport Klub 3
Sport Klub 4
Sport Klub 5
Sport Klub 6
Sport Klub 7
Sport Klub 8
Sport Klub 9
Sport Klub 10
Sport Klub Golf
Sport Klub HD
Sport Klub 4K
N1 (BiH; SRB; CRO)
Cinemania
Grand TV
Grand 2
Lov i ribolov
Fight Channel
Pikaboo
Vavoom
Nova Srbija
Nova TV
Nova BH
Nova M
Nova Sport
IDJ TV
Brainz
Mini TV
Doma TV

Nova Broadcasting Group (Bulgaria)

NOVA
NOVA NEWS
Kino NOVA
Diema
Diema Family
Diema Sport 1, 2, 3
NOVA Sport
Trace Sport Stars
The Voice Radio & TV
Magic FM & TV
Radio Nova News
Radio Vitosha
Radio Veselina
Netinfo EAD
Attica Eva AD
Lenta

Advertising space
CAS Media is the largest agency for the sale of advertising space on cable and satellite channels in the region.

Documentaries

Discovery Channel Serbia
Brainz
Viasat History
Viasat Explore

General entertainment
Nova Srbija
Grand TV
TLC
Investigation Discovery
E!
IDJ TV
HGTV

Children

Pikaboo
Vavoom
Nickelodeon
Nick Jr.

Films

Cinemania
AXN
Cinestar
Cinestar Action
Diva TV
TV1000

News
N1 (Bosnia and Herzegovina, Croatia, Montenegro, Serbia)

Sports

Sport Klub 1
Sport Klub 2
Sport Klub 3
Sport Klub 4
Sport Klub 5
Sport Klub 6
Sport Klub 7
Sport Klub 8
Sport Klub 9
Sport Klub 10
Sport Klub Golf
Sport Klub HD
E-Sports
Lov i ribolov

Legal disputes
When United Group announced its acquisition of Vivacom, the largest Bulgarian telecom, United Group was added to the list of defendants in a lawsuit by Empreno Ventures, which disputes the ownership of Vivacom and the sale of the company.

References

External links
Official Site

Multinational mass media companies
Telecommunications companies established in 2007
2007 establishments in Luxembourg
Mass media companies of Europe
Mass media companies established in 2007
Telecommunications companies of Europe